The Flemish Parliaments 12th legislature started in June 2014 (after the Belgian regional elections of 2014) and lasted until 2019. It was the fifth legislature since the members of the Flemish Parliament were first elected.

The government during this legislative term was the Bourgeois Government, which consisted of the three largest parties N-VA, CD&V and Open Vld.

May 2014 election results

Leadership

Bureau
This is a list of the members of the Bureau of the Flemish Parliament during the 12th legislature.

Speakers

Secretaries

Floor leaders
This is a list of the group leaders (fractieleiders) of the recognised parliamentary groups (fracties) during the 12th legislature. They form the Extended Bureau together with the members of the Bureau.

List

Sources
 
 

2014
2010s in Belgium